Holley Graded School is a historic school building for African American students located at Lottsburg, Northumberland County, Virginia.  It was built in stages between about 1914 and 1933, and is a one-story, cross-shaped plan building. It features four identical-sized classrooms, a central passage, two cloakrooms and a kitchen.  It was used as a schoolhouse until 1959, and subsequently used as a combination museum and adult-education facility.

It was listed on the National Register of Historic Places in 1990.

References

School buildings on the National Register of Historic Places in Virginia
School buildings completed in 1933
Buildings and structures in Northumberland County, Virginia
National Register of Historic Places in Northumberland County, Virginia